The Best American Short Stories 1999, a volume in The Best American Short Stories series, was edited by Katrina Kenison and by guest editor Amy Tan.

Short stories included

Notes

1999 anthologies
Fiction anthologies
Short Stories 1999
Houghton Mifflin books